= The European Knowledge Centre for Youth Policy =

The European Knowledge Centre for Youth Policy is a youth research partnership activity between the Council of Europe and the European Commission.

It is a knowledge management system that provides youth policy makers with a single entry point to retrieve research-based information on the realities of youth across Europe. It is a tool for the implementation of the White Paper on Youth and, in particular, the European Commission 'Common Objectives on a Better Understanding of Youth' and the Council of Europe monitoring of youth policy. It will track the implementation of 'Common Objectives on Participation, Information, Voluntary Activities and a Better Understanding of Youth'.
